

C

 C Me Dance (2009)
 The C Word (2016)
 C-Man (1949)
 C.C. and Company (1970)
 C'est si bon (2015)
 C'mon C'mon (2021)
 C.H.O.M.P.S. (1979)
 C.H.U.D. (1984)
 C.I.D.: (1955, 1956 & 1990)
 C. I. D. (1965)
 C.R.A.Z.Y. (2005)
 C.S.A.: The Confederate States of America (2005)

Ca
 Ca-bau-kan (2002)

Cab

 Cab Calloway's Hi-De-Ho (1934)
 Cab Calloway's Jitterbug Party (1935)
 Cab No. 13 (1926)
 Cab Number 13 (1948)
 A Cab for Three (2001)
 Caballo prieto azabache (1948) 
 Cabaret: (1927, 1953, 1972 & 2019)
 Cabaret Balkan (1998)
 Cabaret Dancer (1986)
 Cabaret Neiges Noires (1997)
 Cabaret Paradis (2006)
 Cabaret Shangai (1950)
 Cabaret Woman (1974)
 The Cabbage Soup (1981)
 The Cabbie (2000)
 The Cabbie's Song (1936)
 Cabeza de Vaca (1991)
 The Cabin (2018)
 Cabin Boy (1994)
 The Cabin in the Cotton (1932)
 The Cabin Crew (2014)
 Cabin Fever series:
 Cabin Fever: (2002 & 2016)
 Cabin Fever 2: Spring Fever (2009)
 Cabin Fever: Patient Zero (2014)
 The Cabin in the Mountains (2014)
 The Cabin Movie (2005)
 Cabin Pressure (2002)
 Cabin in the Sky (1943)
 The Cabin in the Woods (2012)
 The Cabinet of Caligari (1962)
 The Cabinet of Doctor Larifari (1930)
 The Cabinet of Dr. Caligari: (1920 & 2005)
 The Cabinet of Dr. Ramirez (1991)
 The Cabinet of Jan Svankmajer (1984)
 The Cabining (2014)
 Cabiria (1914)
 The Cable Guy (1996)

Cac-Cak

 Caccia al tesoro (2017)
 Caccia all'uomo (1961)
 Cacería (2002)
 Caché (2005)
 Cactus: (1986 & 2008)
 Cactus Flower (1969)
 The Cactus Kid: (1921, 1930 & 1935)
 Cada quién su lucha (1966)
 Cadaver (2020)
 Cadavere a spasso (1965)
 Cadavres (2009)
 Caddie (1976)
 The Caddy (1953)
 Caddyshack (1980)
 Caddyshack II (1988)
 Cadence (1990)
 Cadet Girl (1941)
 Cadet Holiday (1951)
 Cadet Kelly (2002 TV)
 Cadets (1939)
 Cadets on Parade (1942)
 Cadets of St. Martin (1937)
 Cadillac Girls (1993)
 Cadillac Man (1990)
 Cadillac Records (2008)
 Cado dalle nubi (2009)
 Caesar and Cleopatra (1945)
 Caesar the Conqueror (1962)
 Caesar Must Die (2012)
 Caesar and Otto's Deadly Xmas (2012)
 Caesar and Otto's Paranormal Halloween (2015)
 Café de chinos (1949)
 Cafe Isobe (2008)
 Café Lumière (2003)
 Café. Waiting. Love (2014)
 Caffeine (2006)
 The Cage: (1963 & 2017)
 La Cage aux Folles (1978)
 Caged: (1950, 2010, 2011 & 2020)
 The Caged Bird (1913)
 Caged Heat (1974)
 Cages (2005)
 Cahill U.S. Marshal (1973)
 Cain (1918)
 Cain and Abel (2006)
 Cain and Mabel (1936)
 Cain's Cutthroats (1971)
 The Caine Mutiny (1954)
 Cairo: (1942 & 1963)
 Cairo Road (1950)
 Cairo Time (2009)
 Cake: (2005, 2014 & 2018)
 The Cake Eaters (2009)
 Cake: A Wedding Story (2007)

Cal

 Cal: (1984 & 2013)
 Cala, My Dog! (2003)
 Calais-Dover (1931)
 Calamity (1982)
 Calamity Anne's Beauty (1913)
 Calamity Anne's Inheritance (1913)
 Calamity, a Childhood of Martha Jane Cannary (2020)
 Calamity Jane (1953)
 Calapor (2013)
 The Calcium Kid (2004)
 Calculated Risk (1963)
 Calcutta: (1947 & 1969)
 Calcutta 71 (1972)
 Calcutta News (2008)
 Calda e... infedele (1968)
 Caldera (2012)
 The Calendar: (1931 & 1948)
 Calendar Girl: (1947 & 1993)
 Calendar Girls: (2003 & 2015)
 Çalgi Çengi Ikimiz (2017)
 California Dreamin' (2007)
 California Dreaming (1979)
 California Firebrand (1948)
 California Split (1974)
 California Suite (1978)
 California Typewriter (2016)
 The Californians (2005)
 Caligula (1979)
 Caligula... The Untold Story (1982)
 The Call: (2013, 2020 American & 2020 South Korean)
 Call Girl: (1974, 2007 & 2012)
 Call Girl of Cthulhu (2014)
 Call for Love (2007)
 Call Me (1988)
 Call Me Bwana (1963)
 Call Me King (2015)
 Call Me Kuchu (2012)
 Call Me Madam (1953)
 Call Me Mister (1951)
 Call Me Tonight (1986)
 Call Me by Your Name (2017)
 Call Northside 777 (1948)
 The Call of Cthulhu (2005)
 Call of the Blood (1949)
 Call of the Forest: (1949 & 1965)
 The Call of the North: (1914, 1921 & 1929)
 Call of the Rockies: (1938 & 1944)
 The Call of the Wild: (1908, 1923, 1935, 1972, 1976 TV & 2020)
Callas Forever (2002)
 Calle 54 (2000)
 The Caller: (1987, 2008 & 2011)
 Calling Dr. Death (1943)
 Calmi Couri Appassionati (2001)

Cam

 Cam (2018)
 Cambodia: Between War and Peace (1991)
 A Cambodian Spring (2017)
 The Cambric Mask (1919)
 Cambridge Spies (2003)
 The Camden 28 (2007)
 Came the Brawn (1938)
 Came a Hot Friday (1985)
 The Camel Boy (1984)
 Camel Safari (2013)
 Camel Spiders (2011)
 Camel Through the Eye of a Needle (1936)
 The Camel's Dance (1935)
 Cameleon (1997)
 Camelia (1954)
 Camelot (1967)
 The Camels (1988)
 The Camels are Coming (1934)
 The Cameo (1913)
 Cameo Kirby: (1914, 1923 & 1930)
 The Cameo of the Yellowstone (1914)
 Camera: (2000 & 2014)
 Camera Buff (1979)
 Camera d'albergo (1981)
 Camera Obscura: (1921, 2000 & 2015)
 Camera Store (2017)
 Camera Thrills (1935)
 Cameraman: The Life and Work of Jack Cardiff (2010)
 The Cameraman (1928)
 The Cameraman's Revenge (1912)
 Cameraman Gangatho Rambabu (2012)
 Camere da letto (1997)
 Cameriera bella presenza offresi... (1951)
 Camerino Without a Folding Screen (1967)
 Cameron of the Royal Mounted (1921)
 Cameron's Closet (1988)
 Camila (1984)
 Camilla: (1954 & 1994)
 Camille: (1915, 1917, 1921, 1926 feature, 1926 short, 1936, 1984 & 2008)
 Camille 2000 (1969)
 Camille Claudel (1988)
 Camille Claudel 1915 (2013)
 Caminito alegre (1944)
 Caminito de Gloria (1939)
 Camino: (2008 & 2015)
 El Camino: A Breaking Bad Movie (2019)
 Camino a Marte (2017)
 Camouflage: (1944 & 1977)
 Camp: (1965 & 2003)
 The Camp (2013)
 Camp 14: Total Control Zone (2012)
 The Camp on Blood Island (1958)
 Camp Cucamonga (1990 TV)
 Camp Death III in 2D! (2019)
 Camp Fear (1991)
 The Camp Followers (1965)
 Camp Nowhere (1994)
 Camp Rock (2008)
 Camp Rock 2: The Final Jam (2010)
 The Campaign (2012)
 Campfire (2004)
 Campfire Tales: (1991 & 1997)
 Camping Cosmos (1996)
 The Campus (2001)
 The Campus Flirt (1926)
 Campus Mystery (2015)
 The Campus Queen (2004)
 The Campus Vamp (1928)

Can-Cap

 Can of Worms (1999 TV)
 Can You Ever Forgive Me? (2018)
 Can You Keep a Secret? (2019)
 Can-Can (1960)
 Can't Buy Me Love (1987)
 Can't Hardly Wait (1998)
 Can't Stop the Music (1980)
 Canadian Bacon (1995)
 Canadian Pacific (1949)
 The Candidate: (1959, 1964, 1972, 1980, 1998 & 2008)
 Candleshoe (1977)
 Candlestick ((2014)
 Candy: (1968 & 2006)
 Candy Mountain (1988)
 The Candy Tangerine Man (1975)
 Candyman: (1992 & 2021)
 Candyman: Day of the Dead (1999)
 Candyman: Farewell to the Flesh (1995)
 Cane River (1982)
 Cannery Row (1982)
 Cannibal: (2006, 2010 & 2013)
 Cannibal Apocalypse (1980)
 Cannibal Campout (1988)
 Cannibal Ferox (1981)
 Cannibal Girls (1973)
 Cannibal Holocaust (1980)
 Cannibal King (1915)
 The Cannibal Man (1972)
 Cannibal Rollerbabes (1997)
 Cannibal Terror (1981)
 Cannibal Tours (1988)
 Cannibal Women in the Avocado Jungle of Death (1989)
 Cannibal! The Musical (1996)
 Cannon for Cordoba (1970)
 Cannonball (1976)
 The Cannonball Run (1981)
 Cannonball Run II (1984)
 El Cantante (2007)
 Cantata (1963)
 A Canterbury Tale (1944)
 The Canterbury Tales (1972)
 The Canterville Ghost: (1944, 1985 TV, 1986 TV, 1996 TV & 2016)
 The Canyons (2013)
 CAP 2 Intentos (2016)
 Cap Canaille (1983)
 Cap Tourmente (1993)
 Capacité 11 personnes (2004)
 Cape Fear: (1962 & 1991)
 Cape of Good Hope (2004)
 Cape of the North (1976)
 Cape Nostalgia (2014)
 The Caper of the Golden Bulls (1967)
 Capital (2012)
 Capital I (2015)
 Capital Punishment (1925)
 Capitalism: A Love Story (2009)
 Capone: (1975 & 2020)
 Capone Cries a Lot (1985)
 Capote (2005)
 Capriccio: (1938 & 1987)
 Caprice of the Mountains (1916)
 Caprices (1942)
 Caprichosa y millonaria (1940)
 Capricious Summer (1968)
 Capricorn One (1978)
 Captain: (1994, 1999, 2018 & 2019)
 The Captain: (1946, 1971, 2017 & 2019)
 Captain America: (1979 TV & 1990)
 Captain America: Civil War (2016)
 Captain America: The First Avenger (2011)
 Captain America: The Winter Soldier (2014)
 Captain Blood: (1924, 1935 & 1960)
 Captain Clegg (1962)
 Captain Corelli's Mandolin (2001)
 Captain Horatio Hornblower (1951)
 Captain Kidd (1945)
 Captain Kidd and the Slave Girl (1954)
 Captain Kidd, Jr. (1919)
 Captain Kidd's Kids (1919)
 Captain Marvel (2019)
 Captain Newman, M.D. (1963)
 Captain Phillips (2013)
 Captain Ron (1992)
 Captain Underpants: The First Epic Movie (2017)
 The Captain's Paradise (1953)
 Captains of the Clouds (1942)
 Captains Courageous (1937)
 The Captive Heart (1946)
 Captive Women (1952)
 Captivity (2007)
 "#Captured" (2017)
 Capturing the Friedmans (2003)

Car

 The Car: (1977 & 1997)
 Car Babes (2007)
 Car Wash (1976)
 Caramel (2007)
 Carandiru (2003)
 Caravaggio: (1986 & 2007 TV)
 Caravaggio, il pittore maledetto (1941)
 Caravan: (1934, 1946 & 1971)
 Caravan of Courage: An Ewok Adventure (1984 TV)
 The Caravan Trail (1946)
 Carbon Copy (1981)
 The Card Counter (2021)
 The Card Player (2004)
 Cardboard Cavalier (1949)
 The Cardinal: (1936 & 1963)
 Care Bears series:
 The Care Bears Adventure in Wonderland (1987)
 The Care Bears' Big Wish Movie (2005)
 Care Bears: Journey to Joke-a-lot (2004)
 The Care Bears Movie (1985)
 Care Bears Movie II: A New Generation (1986)
 Care Bears: Oopsy Does It! (2007)
 Career Girls (1997)
 Career Opportunities (1991)
 Carefree (1938)
 Careful, He Might Heat You (1983)
 Careful What You Wish For (2015)
 The Carey Treatment (1972)
 Carga de rurales (1896)
 Cargo: (1990, 2006, 2009, 2013, 2017, 2018 & 2019)
 Cargo 200 (2007)
 Carla's Song (1996)
 Carlito's Way (1993)
 Carlos (2010 TV)
 Carmaux, défournage du coke (1896)
 Carmen: (1913, 1915 DeMille, 1915 Walsh, 1918, 1926, 1932, 1943, 1944, 1953, 1983, 1984, 2003 Russian, 2003 Spanish, 2021 & 2022)
 Carmen Jones (1954)
 Carmencita (1894)
 Carmilla (2019)
 The Carmilla Movie (2017)
 Carnage: (2002, 2011 & 2017)
 Carnal Knowledge (1971)
 Carne: (1968 & 1991)
 Carnegie Hall (1947)
 Carnival in Flanders (1935)
 Carnival of Souls: (1962 & 1998)
 Carnosaur (1993)
 Carny: (1980 & 2009 TV)
 Caro diario (1993)
 Carol (2015)
 Carolina: (1934 & 2003)
 Carousel (1956)
 The Carpetbaggers (1964)
 Carpool (1996)
 Carrie: (1976, 2002 & 2013)
 Carried Away: (1996 & 2009)
 Carriers (2009)
 Carrington (1995)
 Carry On (1927)
 Carry On series:
 Carry On Abroad (1972)
 Carry On Again Doctor (1969)
 Carry On Behind (1975)
 Carry On Cabby (1963)
 Carry On Camping (1969)
 Carry On Cleo (1964)
 Carry On Columbus (1992)
 Carry On Constable (1960)
 Carry On Cowboy (1965)
 Carry On Cruising (1962)
 Carry On Dick (1974)
 Carry On Doctor (1967)
 Carry On Emmannuelle (1978)
 Carry On England (1976)
 Carry On Girls (1973)
 Carry On Henry (1971)
 Carry On Jack (1964)
 Carry On Loving (1970)
 Carry On Matron (1972)
 Carry On Nurse (1959)
 Carry On Regardless (1961)
 Carry On Screaming! (1966)
 Carry On Sergeant (1958)
 Carry On Spying (1964)
 Carry On Teacher (1959)
 Carry On Up the Jungle (1970)
 Carry On Up the Khyber (1968)
 Carry On at Your Convenience (1971)
 Don't Lose Your Head (1967)
 Follow That Camel (1967)
 That's Carry On! (1977)
 Cars series:
 Cars (2006)
 Cars 2 (2011)
 Cars 3 (2017)
 The Cars That Ate Paris (1974)
 Carson Nation (2011)
 Cartouche (1962)
 Cartouche, King of Paris (1950)
 Carve Her Name with Pride (1958)
 Carver (2008)
 Carving a Life (2017)

Cas-Caz

 Casa d'appuntamento (1972)
 Casa de los Babys (2003)
 Casa de Mi Padre (2012)
 La casa stregata (1982)
 La Casa del Terror (1959)
 Casablanca (1942)
 Casablanca Beats (2021)
 Casanova: (1918, 1927, 1934, 1976, 1987 TV & 2005)
 Casanova's Big Night (1954)
 Casanovva (2012)
 The Case (2007)
 Case 39 (2009)
 The Case of the Bloody Iris (1972)
 The Case of Charles Peace (1949)
 The Case for Christ (2017)
 The Case of Hana & Alice (2015)
 The Case of the Mukkinese Battle-Horn (1956)
 Case for a Rookie Hangman (1970)
 The Case of the Scorpion's Tail (1971)
 Cash: (1933, 2007, 2008 & 2010)
 Cash and Carry (1937)
 Cash McCall (1960)
 Cashback (2006)
 Casino (1995)
 Casino Jack (2010)
 Casino Royale: (1967 & 2006)
 Casper the Friendly Ghost series:
 Casper (1995)
 Casper Meets Wendy (1998)
 Casper: A Spirited Beginning (1997)
 Casper's Haunted Christmas (2000)
 Casper's Scare School (2006)
 Casque d'or (1952)
 The Cassandra Cat (1963)
 The Cassandra Crossing (1976)
 Cassandra's Dream (2007)
 Casshern (2004)
 Cast Away (2000)
 Cast a Dark Shadow (1955)
 Cast a Deadly Spell (1991) (TV)
 Cast a Giant Shadow (1966)
 Cast a Long Shadow (1959)
 Castaway (1986)
 The Castaway Cowboy (1974)
 The Castle: (1968, 1994, 1997 Australian & 1997 Austrian)
 Castle Falls (2021)
 Castle Freak: (1995 & 2020)
 The Castle of Fu Manchu (1969)
 Castle Keep (1969)
 Castle of the Living Dead (1964)
 The Castle of the Monsters (1958 & 1964)
 Castle in the Sky (1986)
 Castro Street (1966)
 Casualties of War (1989)
 The Cat: (1947, 1956, 1958, 1966, 1977, 1988, 1992 & 2011)
 Cat Ballou (1965)
 A Cat in the Brain (1990)
 The Cat and the Canary: (1927, 1939, 1961 TV & 1978)
 Cat City (1986)
 Cat Concerto (1947)
 The Cat in the Hat (2003)
 Cat on a Hot Tin Roof (1958)
 The Cat and the Moon (2019)
 The Cat o' Nine Tails (1971)
 The Cat from Outer Space (1978)
 Cat People: (1942 & 1982)
 The Cat Returns (2002)
 The Cat Shows Her Claws (1960)
 Cat-Tails for Two (1953)
 Cat's Eye: (1985 & 1997)
 The Cat's Meow (2002)
 Catacombs: (1965 & 2007)
 Catch .44 (2012)
 Catch a Fire (2006)
 Catch the Heat (1987)
 Catch Me If You Can (2002)
 Catch and Release: (2006 & 2018)
 Catch That Kid (2004)
 Catch-22 (1970)
 The Catcher (1998)
 The Catcher Was a Spy (2018)
 Catchfire (1990)
 Category 6: Day of Destruction (2004) (TV)
 Category 7: The End of the World (2005) (TV)
 The Catered Affair (1956)
 Caterina in the Big City (2005)
 Catfish (2010)
 Catherine Called Birdy (2022)
 Catherine the Great: (1920 & 1995 TV)
 Cathy's Curse (1977)
 Cats: (1925, 1998 & 2019)
 The Cats: (1965 & 1968)
 Cats & Dogs (2001)
 Cats & Dogs: The Revenge of Kitty Galore (2010)
 Cats Don't Dance (1997)
 Catscratch (2005)
 Catwoman (2004)
 Catwoman: Hunted (2022)
 Caught: (1931, 1949, 1996 & 2015 TV)
 Caught in the Draft (1941)
 Caught in Time (2020)
 Cause for Alarm! (1951)
 Causeway (2022)
 Cavalcade: (1933 & 1960)
 The Cave: (2005, 2019 Syrian & 2019 Thai)
 Cave of Forgotten Dreams (2010)
 The Cave of the Silken Web: (1927 & 1967)
 The Cave of the Yellow Dog (2005)
 Caveat (2020)
 Caveman (1981)
 The Caveman's Valentine (2002)
 Cavemen (2013)
 Cazuza – Time Don't Stop (2004)

Cb–Ce

 CB4 (1993)
 Cecil B. Demented (2000)
 Cecile Is Dead (1944)
 Cedar Rapids (2011)
 The Celebration (1998)
 Celebrity: (1928 & 1998)
 Celeste and Jesse Forever (2012)
 Celia: (1949 & 1989)
 Celine and Julie Go Boating (1974)
 Cell (2016)
 The Cell (2000)
 The Cell 2 (2009)
 Cell 211 (2009)
 Cell Phone (2003)
 The Cellar (1989)
 Cello (2005)
 Cellular (2004)
 Celluloid Man (2012)
 Celtic Pride (1996)
 The Cement Garden (1993)
 The Cemetery Club: (1993 & 2006)
 Cemetery Junction (2010)
 Cemetery Man (1994)
 Censor: (2001 & 2021)
 Center Stage: (1991 & 2000)
 Center Stage: Turn It Up (2008)
 Center Stage: On Pointe (2016)
 The Center of the World (2001)
 Centigrade: (2007 & 2020)
 Central Park: (1932 & 2017)
 The Central Park Five (2012)
 Central Station (1998)
 Centurion (2010)
 Century Hotel (2001)
 Cerberus (2005) (TV)
 Le Cercle rouge (1970)
 A Certain Magical Index: The Movie – The Miracle of Endymion (2013)
 Certain Women (2016)
 Certified Copy (2010)
 César (1936)
 César and Rosalie (1972)
 Cet homme est dangereux (1953)
 Ceto, the Foolish Millionaire (1953)
 Ceux de la colline (2009)
 Ceylon (2013)

Ch

Cha

 Chad Vader: Day Shift Manager (2006)
 Chai Lai (2006)
 Chain of Fools (2000)
 Chain Letter (2010)
 Chain Lightning: (1922, 1927 & 1950)
 Chain Reaction: (1996 & 2017)
 The Chain Reaction (1980)
 Chained: (1934, 2012, 2019 & 2020)
 Chained Heat (1983)
 Chained for Life: (1952 & 2019)
 Chairman of the Board (1998)
 Chak De India (2007)
 Chakushin Ari (2003)
 Chalet Girl (2011)
 Chalk (2007)
 The Chalk Garden (1964)
 Challenge: (1984 & 2009)
 The Challenge: (1916, 1938, 1948, 1958, 1960, 1970, 1982, 2003, 2011 & 2022)
 Challenge 2 (2012)
 A Challenge for Robin Hood (1967)
 The Challenge... A Tribute to Modern Art (1974)
 Challenger (1990) (TV)
 The Challenger (2015)
 The Challenger Disaster (2013) (TV)
 The Challengers (1990) (TV)
 Challenges (2011)
 Chalte Chalte: (1976 & 2003)
 The Chamber: (1996 & 2016)
 Chamber of Horrors: (1929 & 1966)
 Chameleon Street (1989)
 Chameli (2004)
 The Champ: (1931 & 1979)
 Champagne: (1928 & 2014)
 Champagne for Caesar (1950)
 The Champagne Murders (1967)
 Champion: (1949, 2000, 2002, 2003, 2018 & 2019)
 The Champion: (1915, 1943, 1973 & 2020)
 Champion of the World (2021)
 The Champion of the World (1927)
 Champions: (1984, 1997, 2018 & 2023) 
 Chan Is Missing (1982)
 Chance: (1984, 2002 & 2020)
 Chance at Heaven (1933)
 Chance Meeting: (1954 & 1959)
 The Chancellor Manuscript (2008)
 Chances Are (1989)
 Chandni Bar (2001)
 Chandni Chowk to China (2009)
 Chandramukhi (2007)
 Chandrika (1950)
 Chang (1927)
 Chang Chen Ghost Stories: (2015 & 2016)
 Change of Habit (1969)
 The Change-Up (2011)
 The Changeling (1980)
 Changeling (2008)
 Changes (1969)
 Changing Lanes (2002)
 The Chant of Jimmie Blacksmith (1978)
 Chaos: (2000, 2001 & 2005 Capitol, 2005 Dominion & 2008)
 Le Chaos (2007)
 Chaos Theory (2008)
 Chaos Walking (2021)
 Chaplin (1992)
 The Chaplin Revue (1959)
 Chappaqua (1966)
 Chappaquiddick (2018)
 Chapter 27 (2007)
 Character (1997)
 Charade (1963)
 La Charcuterie mécanique (1895)
 The Charge of the Light Brigade: (1936 & 1968)
 Chariots of Fire (1981)
 Charlatan (2020)
 The Charlatan: (1917 & 1929)
 The Charles Bukowski Tapes (1985)
 Charley Varrick (1973)
 Charlie Bartlett (2008)
 Charlie Chan in Egypt (1935)
 Charlie Chan in London (1934)
 Charlie Chan at the Opera (1937)
 Charlie Chan's Courage (1934)
 Charlie Countryman (2013)
 Charlie and the Chocolate Factory (2005)
 Charlie Muffin (1979)
 Charlie St. Cloud (2010)
 Charlie the Unicorn (2005)
 Charlie Wilson's War (2007)
 Charlie's Angels series:
 Charlie's Angels (2000)
 Charlie's Angels: Full Throttle (2003)
 Charlie's Angels (2019)
 Charlie, the Lonesome Cougar (1967)
 Charlotte: (1974, 1981 & 2021)
 Charlotte et son Jules (1960)
 Charlotte Gray (2001)
 Charlotte Sometimes (2002)
 Charlotte's Web: (1973 & 2006)
 Charlotte's Web 2: Wilbur's Great Adventure (2003)
 Charly (1968)
 Charm City Kings (2020)
 Charro! (1969)
 The Chase: (1946, 1966, 1971, 1991 TV, 1994 & 2017)
 The Chaser: (1938 & 2008)
 Chasers (1994)
 Chasing 3000 (2006)
 Chasing Amy (1997)
 Chasing the Deer (1994)
 Chasing the Dragon (2017)
 Chasing the Dragon II: Wild Wild Bunch (2019)
 Chasing Fortune (1930)
 Chasing Liberty (2004)
 Chasing Madoff (2010)
 Chasing Mavericks (2012)
 Chasing Papi (2003)
 Chasing Sleep (2000)
 Chaste Susanne: (1926 & 1937)
 Chasuke's Journey (2015)
 Le Chat (1971)
 Château de la Reine (2015)
 Chato's Land (1972)
 Chattahoochee (1989)
 Chattanooga Choo Choo (1984)

Che

 Che: Part One (2009)
 Che: Part Two (2009)
 Cheap Thrills (2013)
 Cheaper by the Dozen: (2003 & 2022)
 Cheaper by the Dozen 2 (2005)
 The Cheat: (1912, 1915, 1923, 1931 & 1937)
 Cheaters: (1934 & 2000 TV)
 The Cheaters: (1930 & 1945)
 Cheats (2002)
 Chechi (1950)
 Check (2021)
 Check and Double Check (1930)
 Check the Store Next Door (2016)
 Checkered Flag (1990) (TV)
 The Checkered Flag: (1926 & 1963)
 Checkered Flag or Crash (1977)
 Cheech & Chong's The Corsican Brothers (1984)
 Cheech & Chong's Next Movie (1980)
 Cheeni Kum (2007)
 Cheerleader Queens (2003)
 Cheetah (1989)
 The Cheetah Girls series:
 The Cheetah Girls (film) (2003)
 The Cheetah Girls 2 (2006)
 The Cheetah Girls 3 (2008)
 Chef: (2014 & 2017)
 Chelsea Girls (1966)
 Chelsea on the Rocks (2008)
 Chemical Hearts (2020)
 Chen Mo and Meiting (2002)
 Chennai Express (2013)
 Cheri (2009)
 Cherish in Love (2014)
 Chernobyl: The Final Warning (1991) (TV)
 Chernobyl Diaries (2012)
 Cherry: (2010 & 2021)
 Cherry 2000 (1987)
 Cherry Blossom Memories (2015)
 Cherry Blossoms (2009)
 Cherry Bomb (2011)
 Cherry Falls (2000)
 The Cherry Orchard (1973 TV, 1981 TV & 1999)
 Cherry Returns (2016)
 Cherry Tree (2015)
 Chess of the Wind (1976)
 The Chess Players (1977)
 Chesty Anderson, USN (1976)
 Chevolution (2008)
 Cheyenne Autumn (1964)
 Cheyenne Autumn Trail (1964)
 The Cheyenne Social Club (1970)

Chi–Chu

 Chi-hwa-seon (2002)
 Chi-Raq (2015)
 A Chiara (2021)
 Chica de Río (2001)
 Chicago: (1927 & 2002)
 Chicago 10 (2007)
Chicago Cab (1997)
Chicago Calling (1951)
Chicago Confidential (1957)
Chicago Massacre: Richard Speck (2007)
 Chicken: (2001 & 2015)
 Chicken a La King (1928)
 Chicken Little: (1943 & 2005)
 Chicken Run (2000)
 Chicken with Plums (2011)
 Chickens: (1916 & 1921)
 Chibi Maruko-chan: Italia Kara Kita Shōnen (2015)
 Chihayafuru: Kami no Ku (2016)
 Chilbeontong sosageon (1936)
 Child of Divorce (1946)
 A Child Is Waiting (1965)
 Child 44 (2015)
 Child's Play: (1954, 1972 & 1992)
 Child's Play series:
 Child's Play: (1988 & 2019)
 Child's Play 2 (1990)
 Child's Play 3 (1991)
 Bride of Chucky (1998)
 Seed of Chucky (2004)
 Curse of Chucky (2013)
 Cult of Chucky (2017)
 Child's Pose (2013)
 Childhood Days (1990)
 Children: (2006 & 2011)
 The Children: (1980, 1990 & 2008)
 The Children Act (2017)
 The Children Are Watching Us (1944)
 Children of the Corn series:
 Children of the Corn: (1984 & 2009 TV)
 Children of the Corn II: The Final Sacrifice (1993)
 Children of the Corn III: Urban Harvest (1995)
 Children of the Corn IV: The Gathering (1996)
 Children of the Corn V: Fields of Terror (1998)
 Children of the Corn 666: Isaac's Return (1999)
 Children of the Corn: Revelation (2001)
 Children of the Corn: Genesis (2011)
 Children of the Damned (1964)
 Children of the Dark (1994) (TV)
 Children of Divorce: (1927 & 1939)
 Children of Heaven (1997)
 Children of Hiroshima (1952)
 The Children’s of Huang Shi (2008)
 Children of a Lesser God (1986)
 Children of the Living Dead (2001)
 Children of Love (1953)
 Children of Men (2006)
 Children of the Night: (1985 & 1991)
 Children of Paradise (1945)
 Children of the Revolution: (1923, 1996 & 2010) 
 Children of the Sea (2019)
 Children Shouldn't Play with Dead Things (1972)
 Children of the Stork (1999)
 Children of the Street (1929)
 Children of the Streets (1914)
 Children of Troubled Times (1935)
 Children Who Chase Lost Voices (2011)
 The Children's Hour (1961)
 A Children's Story (2004)
 Childstar (2004)
 Chill Factor (1999)
 Chilly Scenes of Winter (1979)
 Chimera Strain (2018)
 The Chimes (1914)
 Chimes at Midnight (1965)
 Chimmie Fadden (1915)
 Chimmie Fadden Out West (1915)
 The Chimney Sweep (1906)
 The Chimp: (1932 & 2001)
 Chimpanzee (2012)
 China (1943)
 China 9, Liberty 37 (1978)
 China Clipper (1936)
 China Gate: (1957 & 1998)
 China Moon (1994)
 China Seas (1935)
 China Sky (1945)
 The China Syndrome (1979)
 Chinaman (2005)
 Chinatown (1974)
 Chinese Box (1997)
 Chinese Coffee (2000)
 Chinese Doctors (2021)
 A Chinese Ghost Story: (1987 & 2011)
 A Chinese Ghost Story II (1990)
 A Chinese Ghost Story III (1991)
 A Chinese Odyssey (1995)
 Chinese Odyssey 2002 (2002)
 A Chinese Odyssey Part Three (2016)
 Chinese Opium Den (1894)
 The Chinese Parrot (1927)
 Chinese Puzzle (2013)
 The Chinese Puzzle: (1919 & 1932)
 Chino: (1973 & 1991) 
 La Chinoise (1968)
 Chinthavishtayaya Shyamala (1998)
 Chip 'n Dale: Rescue Rangers (2022)
 The Chipmunk Adventure (1987)
 Chiriyakhana (1967)
 Chiriyo Chiri (1982)
 Chirusoku no Natsu (2003)
 Chisum (1970)
 Chitty Chitty Bang Bang (1968)
 Chloé (1996)
 Chloe (2010)
 Chloe and Theo (2015)
 Chocolat: (1988, 2000 & 2016)
 Chocolate: (2005, 2007 & 2008)
 The Chocolate War (1988)
 The Choice: (1970 & 2016)
 The Choice 2020 (2020) (TV)
 The Choirboys (1977)
 Choke: (2008 & 2011)
 Choke Canyon (1986)
 Chokher Bali (2003)
 Chongqing Hot Pot (2016)
 Choorian: (1963 & 1998)
 Choose or Die (2022)
 Choose Me (1984)
 Chopper (2000)
 Chopper Chicks in Zombietown (1989)
 Chopping Mall (1986)
 Choreography for Copy Machine (1991)
 Chori Chori Chupke Chupke (2001)
 The Chorus (2004)
 A Chorus Line (1985)
 Chota Mumbai (2007)
 Christ Stopped at Eboli (1979)
 Christiane F. (1981)
 Christine: (1958, 1983 & 2016)
 Christine, Princess of Eroticism (1978)
 Christmas, Again (2014)
 Christmas in August (1998)
 Christmas Bounty (2013)
 The Christmas Candle (2013)
 The Christmas Card (2006) (TV)
 A Christmas Carol: (1908, 1910, 1938, 1951, 1971, 1984 TV, 1997, 1999 TV, 2004 TV, 2006, 2009, 2019 TV & 2022)
 Christmas Carol: The Movie (2001)
 Christmas Child (2003)
 The Christmas Chronicles (2018)
 The Christmas Chronicles 2 (2020)
 Christmas in Connecticut (1945)
 Christmas Cottage (2008)
 Christmas Cruelty! (2013)
 The Christmas Dream (1900)
 Christmas Eve: (1947 & 2015)
 Christmas Evil (1980)
 Christmas Holiday (1944)
 Christmas in July (1940)
 Christmas with the Kranks (2004)
 Christmas Lilies of the Field (1979) (TV)
 Christmas on Mars (2008)
 Christmas Memories (1915)
 A Christmas Prince (2017)
 A Christmas Prince: The Royal Baby (2019)
 A Christmas Prince: The Royal Wedding (2018)
 The Christmas Shoes (2002) (TV)
 A Christmas Story (1983)
 A Christmas Story 2 (2012)
 A Christmas Story Christmas (2022)
 A Christmas Tale (2008)
 Christmas in Tattertown (1988) (TV)
 The Christmas That Almost Wasn't (1966)
 The Christmas Toy (1986) (TV)
 The Christmas Tree: (1966, 1969 & 1996 TV)
 Christopher Robin (2018)
 Christopher Strong (1933)
 Chronicle (2012)
 Chronicle of a Blood Merchant (2015)
 Chronicle of a Disappearance (1996)
 Chronicles of the Ghostly Tribe (2015)
 The Chronicles of Melanie (2016)
 The Chronicles of Narnia series:
 The Chronicles of Narnia: The Lion, the Witch and the Wardrobe (2005)
 The Chronicles of Narnia: Prince Caspian (2008)
 The Chronicles of Narnia: The Voyage of the Dawn Treader (2010)
 The Chronicles of Riddick (2004)
 Chuck (2016)
 Chuck & Buck (2000)
 Chuck Amuck: The Movie (1991)
 Chulas Fronteras (1976)
 Chump Change (2004)
 A Chump at Oxford (1940)
 The Chumscrubber (2005)
 Chungking Express (1994)
 Chunhyang (2000)
 Chup Chup Ke (2006)
 The Church (1989)
 Church Ball (2006)
 Churchill: The Hollywood Years (2004)
 Chushingura (1963)
 Chutney Popcorn (1999)

Ci–Cl

 El Cid (1961)
 The Cider House Rules (1999)
 La ciénaga (2001)
 Cigarettes & Coffee (1993)
 Cimarron: (1931 & 1960)
 The Cincinnati Kid (1965)
 Cinderella: (1899, 1914, 1916, 1947, 1955, 1957 TV, 1960, 1965 TV, 1977, 1979, 1997 TV, 2000 TV, 2002, 2006, 2012, 2015 Disney, 2015 Indian, 2021 American & 2021 Indian)
 Cinderella series:
 Cinderella (1950)
 Cinderella II: Dreams Come True (2002)
 Cinderella III: A Twist in Time (2007)
 Cinderella or the Glass Slipper (1913)
 Cinderella Liberty (1973)
 Cinderella Man (2005)
 A Cinderella Story series:
 A Cinderella Story (2004)
 Another Cinderella Story (2008)
 A Cinderella Story: Once Upon a Song (2011)
 A Cinderella Story: If the Shoe Fits (2016)
 A Cinderella Story: Christmas Wish (2019)
 A Cinderella Story: Starstruck (2021)
 Cinderfella (1960)
 Cindy: The Doll Is Mine (2005)
 Cinema Paradiso (1988)
 Cinema, Aspirins and Vultures (2005)
 Cinerama Holiday (1955)
 The Circle: (1925, 2000, 2014, 2015 & 2017)
 Circle of Friends: (1995 & 2006 TV)
 Circle of Iron (1978)
 Circuit no Ōkami (1977)
 The Circus: (1928 & 1943)
 Circus: (1936 & 2000)
 Circus World (1964)
 Cirque du Freak: The Vampire's Assistant (2009)
 Cirque du Soleil: Worlds Away (2012)
 Citadel (2012)
 The Citadel: (1938 & 1960)
 Cities in Love (2015)
 Citizen Cohn (1992)
 Citizen Kane (1941)
 Citizen Ruth (1996)
 Citizen Toxie: The Toxic Avenger IV (2001)
 Citizen X (1995 TV)
 The City: (1916, 1926, 1939, 1977, 1994 & 1998)
 City of Angels (1998)
 City for Conquest (1940)
 City of Damnation (2009)
 The City of the Dead (1960)
 City of Dead Men (2014)
 The City and the Dogs (1985)
 City of Ember (2008)
 City on Fire: (1979 & 1987)
 City of Ghosts: (2002 & 2017)
 City Girl: (1930, 1938 & 1984)
 City of God: (2002 & 2011)
 City of God – 10 Years Later (2013)
 City Hall (1996)
 City Heat (1984)
 City Hunter (1993)
 City of Industry (1997)
 City Island (2009)
 City of Joy (1992)
 City of Lies (2018)
 City of Life and Death (2009)
 City Lights (1931)
 City of the Living Dead (1980)
 The City of Lost Children (1995)
 City of Men (2007)
 A City of Sadness (1989)
 City by the Sea (2002)
 City Slickers (1991)
 City Slickers II: The Legend of Curly's Gold (1994)
 City That Never Sleeps (1953)
 The City That Never Sleeps (1924)
 City Under the Sea (1965)
 The City of Violence (2006)
 The City Without Jews (1924)
 City of Women (1980)
 A Civil Action (1998)
 Civilization (1916)
 CJ7 (2008)
 The Claim: (1918 & 2000)
 Claire's Knee (1970)
 The Clairvoyant: (1924, 1935 & 1982)
 Clambake (1967)
 The Clan: (1920, 2005 & 2015)
 The Clan of the Cave Bear (1986)
 Clan of the White Lotus (1980)
 Clapboard Jungle (2020)
 The Clapper (2017)
 Clara's Heart (1988)
 Clash by Night (1952)
 Clash of the Titans: (1981 & 2010)
 The Clash of the Wolves (1925)
 The Class (2007 & 2008)
 Class (1983)
 Class of '44 (1973)
 Class of 1984 (1982)
 Class of 1999 (1990)
 Class Action (1991)
 The Class of Nuke 'Em High (1986)
 A Class to Remember (1993)
 Classe tous risques (1960)
 Classmates: (1914, 1924, 2006, 2007 & 2015)
 The Claus Family (2020)
 Claustrophobia: (2004 & 2008)
 The Claw: (1918 & 1927)
 Claws (1977)
 Clay: (1965 & 2008 TV)
 Clay Pigeon (1971)
 The Clay Pigeon (1949)
 Clay Pigeons (1998)
 A Claymation Christmas Celebration (1987 TV)
 Clean: (2004 & 2021)
 Clean and Sober (1988)
 Clean, Shaven (1994)
 The Cleaner (2012)
 Cleaner (2008)
 The Cleanse (2016)
 Clear Cut: The Story of Philomath, Oregon (2006)
 Clear and Present Danger (1994)
 Clearcut (1991)
 The Clearing (2004)
 Clemency (2019)
 Cleo: (2019 Belgian & 2019 German)
 Cléo from 5 to 7 (1962)
 Cleopatra: (1912, 1917, 1928, 1934, 1963, 1970, 1999 TV, 2003, 2007 & 2013)
 Cleopatra Jones (1973)
 Cleopatra Jones and the Casino of Gold (1975)
 Clerk (1989)
 Clerks (1994)
 Clerks II (2006)
 Clerks III (2022)
 Cleveland Abduction (2015)
 Click: (2006 & 2010)
 The Client: (1994 & 2011)
 Cliffhanger (1993)
 Clifford the Big Red Dog (2021)
 Clifford's Really Big Movie (2004)
 Cliffs of Freedom (2019)
 Climax: (1965, 2013 & 2018)
 The Climber: (1917, 1966 & 1975)
 The Climbers: (1915, 1919, 1927 & 2019) 
 Climbing to Spring (2014)
 The Clinging Vine (1926)
 The Clinic (1982)
 The Clinic (2010)
 Clinical (2017)
 The Clique (2008)
 Cloaca (2003)
 Cloak & Dagger: (1946 & 1984)
 The Clock: (1917, 1945 & 2010)
 Clockers (1995)
 The Clockmaker (1974)
 Clockstoppers (2002)
 Clockwatchers (1997)
 Clockwise (1986)
 The Clockwork Girl (2014)
 A Clockwork Orange (1971)
 Cloned (1997)
 Close: (2019 & 2022)
 Close Encounters of the Third Kind (1977)
 Close Range Love (2014)
 Close Your Eyes (2002)
 Close-Up: (1948 & 1990)
 Closed Circuit: (1978 & 2013)
 Closed Curtain (2013)
 Closed Doors Village (2014)
 Closed for the Season (2010)
 Closely Watched Trains (1966)
 Closer (2004)
 The Closet: (2001 & 2007)
 Closet Cases of the Nerd Kind (1980)
 Closing the Ring (2007)
 Cloud Atlas (2012)
 Clouds of Sils Maria (2014)
 Cloudy with a Chance of Meatballs series:
 Cloudy with a Chance of Meatballs (2009)
 Cloudy with a Chance of Meatballs 2 (2013)
 The Clovehitch Killer (2018)
 Cloverfield series:
 Cloverfield (2008)
 10 Cloverfield Lane (2016)
 The Cloverfield Paradox (2018)
 Clown (2014)
 The Clown: (1916, 1926, 1927, 1931, 1953, 1976 & 2011)
 The Clown Barber (1898)
 The Clown at Midnight (1998)
 The Clown Murders (1976)
 Le Clown et ses chiens (1892)
 Clownhouse (1990)
 The Clowns (1970)
 The Club: (1980 & 2015)
 Club Dread (2004)
 Club Paradise (1986)
 Clubhouse Detectives (1996)
 Clubland: (1990 TV, 1999 & 2007)
 Clue (1985)
 Clueless (1995)
 Cluny Brown (1946)

Co

 Co mój mąż robi w nocy (1934)
 Co-ed Call Girl (1996 TV)

Coa–Col

 Coach: (1978 & 2018)
 Coach Carter (2005)
 Coach to Vienna (1966)
 Coach of the Year (1980 TV)
 Coal Black and de Sebben Dwarfs (1943)
 Coal Face (1935)
 Coal Miner's Daughter (1980)
 Coalition (2015 TV)
 Coals of Fire: (1915 & 1918)
 Coast to Coast: (1980, 1987 & 2003)
 The Coast Guard (2002)
 Coast of Skeletons (1965)
 Coastal Command (1942)
 Coastal Elites (2020 TV)
 Coasts in the Mist (1986)
 Cobb (1994)
 The Cobbler (2014)
 Cobra: (1925, 1986, 1991, 2012 & 2022)
 The Cobra (1967)
 Cobra Verde (1987)
 Cobra Woman (1944)
 The Coca-Cola Kid (1985)
 Cocaine (1922)
 Cocaine Bear (2023)
 Cocaine Cowboys: (1979 & 2006)
 Cock and Bull (2016)
 A Cock and Bull Story (2005)
 Cockfighter (1974)
 Cocksucker Blues (1972)
 Cocktail: (1988, 2006, 2010, 2012 & 2020)
 Coco: (2009 & 2017) 
 Coco Before Chanel (2009)
 The Cocoanuts (1929)
 Cocoon (1985)
 Cocoon: The Return (1988)
 Coda: (1987 TV & 2019)
 CODA (2021)
 Code 46 (2003)
 Code Name: The Cleaner (2007)
 Code of Silence: (1985 & 2015)
 Code Unknown (2000)
 Codebreaker (2011 TV)
 Codename Cougar (1989)
 
 "#CoEdConfessions" (2017)
 A Coffee in Berlin (2012)
 Coffee and Cigarettes (2003)
 Coffee Town (2013)
 Coffin (2011)
 Coffy (1973)
 The Cohasset Snuff Film (2012)
 Coherence (2013)
 Cold Cold Heart (2007)
 Cold Comfort Farm (1995)
 Cold Creek Manor (2003)
 Cold Dog Soup (1990)
 Cold Eyes (2013)
 Cold Eyes of Fear (1971)
 Cold Fever (1995)
 Cold Heaven (1991)
 Cold Hell (2017)
 Cold in July (2014)
 The Cold Lands (2013)
 Cold Light of Day (1989)
 The Cold Light of Day (2012)
 Cold Mountain (2003)
 A Cold Night's Death (1973 TV)
 Cold Prey (2006)
 Cold Pursuit (2019)
 Cold Showers (2005)
 Cold Souls (2009)
 Cold Sweat: (1970 & 1993)
 Cold Turkey (1971)
 Cold War: (2012 & 2018)
 Cold War 2 (2016)
 Cold Water (1994)
 Cold Winter Sun (2004)
 The Colditz Story (1955)
 Coldwater (2013)
 Collaborator (2012)
 Collateral (2004)
 Collateral Beauty (2016)
 Collateral Damage (2002)
 The Collection (2012)
 La Collectionneuse (1967)
 The Collector: (1965 & 2009)
 College: (1927 & 2008)
 The College Hero (1927)
 College Road Trip (2008)
 Collide (2016)
 The Collingswood Story (2002)
 Collision Course (1989)
 Cologne: From the Diary of Ray and Esther (1939)
 Colombiana (2011)
 The Colonel: (1917 & 1974)
 Colonel Chabert: (1943 & 1994)
 Colonel Panics (2016)
 Colonel Redl: (1925 & 1985)
 Color of a Brisk and Leaping Day (1996)
 The Color of Friendship (2000)
 The Color of Lies (1999)
 Color Me Blood Red (1965)
 Color Me True (2018)
 The Color of Money (1986)
 Color of Night (1994)
 Color Out of Space (2019)
 The Color of Paradise (2000)
 The Color of Pomegranates (1969)
 The Color Purple (1985)
 Colorado Pioneers (1945)
 Colorado Territory (1949)
 Colorful (2010)
 Colors (1988)
 Colossal (2016)
 Colossal Youth (2006)
 The Colossus of New York (1958)
 The Colossus of Rhodes (1961)
 Colossus: The Forbin Project (1970)
 Colour Blossoms (2004)
 The Colour of Magic (2008)
 Colour Me Kubrick (2006)
 Columbus: (2015 & 2017)
 Columbus Circle (2012)
 The Columnist (2019)

Com

 Coma: (1978, 2009, 2020 & 2022)
 Comanche Station (1960)
 The Comancheros (1961)
 Comandante (2003)
 Combat Academy (1986 TV)
 Combat Shock (1986)
 Come Along, Do! (1898)
 Come Back to the Five and Dime, Jimmy Dean, Jimmy Dean (1982)
 Come Back, Africa (1959)
 Come Back, Little Sheba (1952)
 Come Blow Your Horn (1973)
 Come Drink with Me (1966)
 Come Fill the Cup (1951)
 Come and Get It: (1929 & 1936)
 Come and See (1985)
 Come See the Paradise (1990)
 Come September (1961)
 Come True (2020)
 Come Undone: (2000 & 2010)
 The Comebacks (2007)
 Comedian (2003)
 The Comedy of Terrors (1964)
 Comes a Horseman (1978)
 Comfort and Joy: (1984 & 2003 TV)
 The Comfort of Strangers (1991)
 Comic Book Confidential (1988)
 Comic Book: The Movie (2004)
 Comic-Con Episode IV: A Fan's Hope (2011)
 Comic Costume Race (1896)
 Coming to America series: 
 Coming to America (1988)
 Coming 2 America (2021)
 Coming Apart (1969)
 Coming Home: (1973, 1978, 2012, 2014, 2018 & 2020)
 Coming Home in the Dark (2021)
 Coming Out: (1989, 2000 & 2013)
 Coming Soon: (1982, 1999, 2008 & 2014)
 Command Decision (1949)
 Commandments (1997)
 Commando: (1962, 1985 & 1988)
 Commando series:
 Commando: A One Man Army (2013)
 Commando 2: The Black Money Trail (2017)
 Commando 3 (2019)
 La commare secca (1962)
 Comme un aimant (2000)
 Commissar (1967)
 The Commitments (1991)
 Committed: (1991 & 2000)
 Common Ground: (1916, 2000 TV & 2002)
 Common Law Cabin (1967)
 A Common Thread (2004)
 Communication Breakdown (2004)
 Communion: (1989 & 2016)
 The Commuter (2018)
 Companeros (1972)
 The Companion (2015)
 Companion Wanted (1932)
 The Company (2003)
 The Company Men (2011)
 The Company of Wolves (1984)
 The Company You Keep (2012)
 Compartment No. 6 (2021)
 The Competition: (1980 & 2018)
 Compliance (2012)
 Compulsion: (1959, 2013 & 2016)
 The Computer Wore Tennis Shoes (1969)
 Comrade (2017)
 Comrade Abram (1919)
 Comrade in America (2017)
 Comrade Arseny (1964)
 Comrade Chkalov Crosses the North Pole (1990)
 Comrade Kim Goes Flying (2012)
 Comrade Pedersen (2006)
 Comrade X (1940)
 Comrades: (1919, 1921, 1928 & 1986)
 Comrades at Sea (1938)
 Comrades: Almost a Love Story (1996)
 Comradeship (1919)

Con

 Con Air (1997)
 Conan the Barbarian: (1982 & 2011)
 Conan the Destroyer (1984)
 The Concert: (1921, 1931 & 2009)
 The Concert for Bangladesh (1972)
 Concert at the End of Summer (1980)
 The Concorde ... Airport '79 (1979)
 Concrete (2004)
 Concrete Cowboy (2020)
 Concrete Cowboys (1979) (TV)
 Concrete Utopia (2021)
 The Concubine (2012)
 Concussion: (2013 & 2015)
 Condemned: (1929 & 2015)
 The Condemned: (1975 & 2007)
 The Condemned 2 (2015)
 Cone of Silence (1960)
 Coneheads (1993)
 Coney Island: (1917, 1928, 1943 & 1991)
 Coney Island Baby (2003)
 Confession: (1929, 1937, 1955, 2014 & 2015)
 The Confession: (1920, 1970, 1999, 2002 & 2010)
 Confessions: (1925 & 2010)
 Confessions of a Dangerous Mind (2002)
 Confessions of a Driving Instructor (1976)
 Confessions of a Frustrated Housewife (1976)
 Confessions from a Holiday Camp (1977)
 Confessions of a Monk (1922)
 Confessions of a Nazi Spy (1939)
 Confessions of a Police Captain (1971)
 Confessions of a Queen (1925)
 Confessions of a Shopaholic (2009)
 Confessions of a Sorority Girl (1994) (TV)
 Confessions of a Teenage Drama Queen (2004)
 Confessions of a Window Cleaner (1974)
 Confetti: (1927 & 2006)
 Confidence: (1933, 1980 & 2003)
 Confidential: (1935 & 1986)
 Confidential Assignment (2017)
 Confidential Assignment 2: International (2022)
 Confidentially Yours (1983)
 Conflict: (1936, 1938 & 1945)
 The Conformist: (1970 & 2017)
 The Confrontation (1969)
 Confucius: (1940 & 2010)
 Congo (1995)
 Congo Jazz (1930)
 The Congress: (1988 & 2013)
 Congress Dances (1932)
 The Congress Dances (1955)
 Conjurer Making Ten Hats in Sixty Seconds (1896)
 Conjuring (1896)
 The Conjuring series:
 The Conjuring (2013)
 The Conjuring 2 (2016)
 The Conjuring: The Devil Made Me Do It (2021)
 A Connecticut Yankee in King Arthur's Court: (1921 & 1949)
 Connecting Rooms (1970)
 Connie and Carla (2004)
 The Conqueror: (1917 & 1956)
 The Conquerors: (1932 & 2013)
 Conquest: (1928, 1937, 1983 & 1998)
 The Conquest: (1996 & 2011)
 The Conquest of Everest (1953)
 Conquest of the Planet of the Apes (1972)
 Conquest of Space (1955)
 Conrack (1974)
 Consenting Adults: (1992 & 2007 TV)
 Conspiracy: (1927, 1930, 1939, 2000, 2001 TV & 2008)
 The Conspiracy: (1913, 1914, 1916 & 2012)
 Conspiracy Theory (1997)
 The Conspirator (2010)
 The Conspirators: (1924, 1944 & 1969)
 A Constant Forge (2000)
 The Constant Gardener (2005)
 The Constant Nymph: (1928, 1933 & 1943)
 Constantine (2005)
 Constellation (2007)
 Consuming Passions (1989)
 Contact: (1978, 1992, 1997 & 2009)
 The Contact: (1963 & 1997)
 Contagion: (1987 & 2011)
 Contempt (1963)
 The Contender: (1944 & 2000)
 Continental Divide (1981)
 Contraband: (1925, 1940, 1980 & 2012)
 Contraband Spain (1955)
 Contract: (1985 & 2008)
 The Contract: (1971, 1978, 2006 & 2016)
 Contracted (2013)
 The Contractor: (2007 & 2013)
 Control: (1987, 2003, 2004, 2007 & 2013)
 Control Room (2004)
 The Convent: (1995, 2000 & 2018)
 The Conversation (1974)
 Conversations with Other Women (2006)
 Convict (1936)
 The Convict (1910)
 Convict 13 (1920)
 The Convicted (1927)
 Conviction: (2002 TV & 2010)
 Convicts (1991)
 Convoy: (1927, 1940 & 1978)

Coo–Cot

 Coogan's Bluff (1968)
 The Cook (1917, 1918 & 1965)
 The Cook, the Thief, His Wife & Her Lover (1989)
 Cook Up a Storm (2017)
 Cookie (1989)
 Cookie's Fortune (1999)
 The Cookout (2004)
 Cool and the Crazy (1994)
 Cool Hand Luke (1967)
 Cool as Ice (1991)
 Cool Runnings (1993)
 Cool World (1992)
 The Cool World (1963)
 A Cool, Dry Place (1998)
 The Cooler (2003)
 Cooley High (1975)
 Coonskin (1975)
 Cop (1988)
 A Cop (1972)
 The Cop: (1928 & 1970)
 Cop and a Half (1993)
 Cop Hater (1958)
 Cop Land (1997)
 A Cop Movie (2021)
 Cop Out (2010)
 Copper Mountain (1983)
 Copperhead (2013)
 Cops (1922)
 Cops and Robbers: (1951, 1973 & 1997)
 Copshop (2021)
 Copycat (1995)
 Copying Beethoven (2006)
 Coral Reef Adventure (2003)
 Coraline (2009)
 Corazón salvaje (1956)
 Le Corbeau (1943)
 Corbett and Courtney Before the Kinetograph (1894)
 The Corbett-Fitzsimmons Fight (1897)
 The Core (2003)
 Coriolanus (2011)
 Corky Romano (2001)
 The Corn Is Green (1945)
 A Corner in Wheat (1909)
 Cornered (1945)
 A Corny Concerto (1943)
 Corporate Animals (2019)
 The Corporation: (2003 & 2012)
 The Corpse of Anna Fritz (2015)
 Corpse Bride (2005)
 The Corpse Grinders (1971)
 Corpse Party (2015)
 The Corpse Vanishes (1942)
 Corpus Christi: (2014 & 2019)
 Corrections Class (2014)
 Corrective Measures (2022)
 Corridor (2012)
 The Corridor: (1968, 1995, 2010 & 2013)
 Corridor of Mirrors (1948)
 Corridors of Blood (1958)
 Corrina, Corrina (1994)
 The Corruptor (1999)
 Corsage (2022)
 Corso: The Last Beat (2009)
 Corvette K-225 (1943)
 Corvette Summer (1978)
 Cosi (1996)
 Cosmic Sin (2021)
 Cosmopolis (2012)
 Cosmos: (1996, 2010 & 2015)
 Costa Brava, Lebanon (2021)
 The Costello Case (1930)
 Cosy Dens (1999)
 The Cottage (2008)
 A Cottage on Dartmoor (1929)
 The Cotton Club (1984)

Cou-Coz

 The Couch Trip (1987)
 Le Coucher de la Mariée (1896)
 The Counselor (2013)
 Counsellor at Law (1933)
 Count Dracula: (1970 & 1977 TV)
 Count Dracula's Great Love (1974)
 The Count of Monte Cristo: (1912, 1913, 1934, 1942, 1943, 1953, 1954, 1961, 1975 TV & 2002)
 Count Three and Pray (1955)
 Count Yorga, Vampire (1970)
 Countdown: (1968, 2004 & 2011)
 Countdown to Looking Glass (1984) (TV)
 Counterfeit: (1919 & 1936)
 The Counterfeit Traitor (1962)
 The Counterfeiters: (1948, 2007 & 2010 TV)
 The Counterfeiters of Paris (1961)
 Countess Dracula (1971)
 A Countess from Hong Kong (1967)
 Country (1984)
 The Country Bears (2002)
 The Country Girl: (1915 & 1954)
 Country Strong (2011)
 The Countryman and the Cinematograph (1901)
 Coup de Grâce: (1969 & 1976)
 Coup de Torchon (1981)
 Couples Retreat (2009)
 Courage: (1930, 1939 & 2011)
 Courage for Every Day (1965)
 Courage Under Fire (1996)
 Courageous (2011)
 The Courier: (2012, 2019 & 2020)
 Court (2014)
 The Court of Honor (1948)
 The Court Jester (1956)
 The Courtship of Eddie's Father (1963)
 Cousin Cousine (1976)
 Cousins: (1989, 2014 & 2021)
 Les Cousins (1959)
 The Cove (2009)
 Coven: (1997 & 2020)
 The Coven (2015)
 The Covenant: (1985 TV & 2006)
 Cover Girl (1944)
 The Covered Wagon (1923)
 Cow: (2009 & 2021)
 The Cow: (1969 & 1989)
 Cow Belles (2006) (TV)
 Cow on the Moon (1959)
 Cow Town (1950)
 The Coward: (1915, 1927, 1939 & 1953)
 Coward Hero (2019)
 Cowards (1970)
 Cowards Bend the Knee (2003)
 Cowboy: (1958, 1966 & 2013)
 Cowboy Bebop: The Movie (2001)
 Cowboy Blues (1946)
 The Cowboy Way (1994)
 The Cowboys (1972)
 Cowboys & Aliens (2011)
 Coyote: (1992 & 2007)
 The Coyote (1955)
 Coyote and Bronca (1980)
 Coyote Lake (2019)
 Coyote Ugly (2000)
 Coyote: The Mike Plant Story (2017)
 Coz Ov Moni (2010)
 Coz Ov Moni 2 (2013)

Cq–Cr

 CQ (2001)
 A Crack in the Floor (2001)
 Crack in the World (1965)
 Crack-Up: (1936 & 1946)
 Cracked Eggs and Noodles (2005)
 Crackerjack: (1938, 1994 & 2002)
 Crackers: (1984, 1998 & 2011)
 Cracking Up: (1983 & 1994)
 Cracks (2009)
 Cradle 2 the Grave (2003)
 Cradle of Fear (2001)
 Cradle Will Rock (1999)
 The Craft (1996)
 The Craft: Legacy (2020)
 The Cranes Are Flying (1957)
 Crank (2006)
 Crank: High Voltage (2009)
 Crash: (1974, 1996 & 2004)
 Crash Landing: (1958 & 1999)
 Crash Pad (2017)
 Crash Site (2011)
 Crashout (1955)
 Crater (TBD)
 The Crater Lake Monster (1977)
 Crawl: (2011 & 2019)
 The Crawlers (1993)
 The Crawling Eye (1958)
 Crawlspace: (1972 TV, 1986, 2004, 2012 & 2013)
 Crayon (2010)
 Crazed Fruit (1956)
 The Crazies: (1973 & 2010)
 Crazy: (1999, 2000 & 2007)
 Crazy in Alabama (1999)
 Crazy Eights (2006)
 Crazy English (1999)
 Crazy Heart (2009)
 Crazy As Hell (2002)
 Crazy Love: (1979, 1987, 1993, 2007 & 2014)
 Crazy Money (1981)
 Crazy New Year’s Eve (2015)
 The Crazy Ray (1924)
 Crazy Rich Asians (2018)
 Crazy Rook (2015)
 Crazy Stone (2006)
 The Crazy Stranger (1997)
 Crazy, Stupid, Love. (2011)
 Crazy/Beautiful (2001)
 Created Equal (2017)
 Creation: (1922, 1931 & 2009)
 Creative Control (2015)
 Creature: (1985, 1999 & 2011)
 The Creature (1924)
 Creature from the Black Lagoon (1954)
 Creature from Black Lake (1976)
 Creature from the Haunted Sea (1961)
 The Creature Walks Among Us (1956)
 Creed series:
 Creed (2015)
 Creed II (2018)
 Creed III (2023)
 Creep: (2004 & 2014)
 Creep 2 (2017)
 The Creeping Flesh (1973)
 The Creeping Terror (1964)
 Creepozoids (1987)
 Creeps (1956)
 Creepshow series:
 Creepshow (1982)
 Creepshow 2 (1987)
 Creepshow 3 (2007)
 Creepy (2016)
 The Cremator (1969)
 The Crew (2000)
 A Cricket in the Ear (1976)
 The Cricket on the Hearth: (1909 & 1923)
 Cries and Whispers (1973)
 Cries Unheard: The Donna Yaklich Story (1994)
 A Crime on the Bayou (2020)
 Crime of the Century: (1946 & 1996 TV)
 The Crime of the Century: (1933 & 2021)
 Crime at the Chinese Restaurant (1981)
 Crime Doctor (1943)
 The Crime of Dr. Crespi (1935)
 The Crime of Father Amaro (2002)
 Crime Hunter (1989)
 The Crime of Monsieur Lange (1936)
 A Crime in Paradise (2001)
 Crime and Punishment: (1917, 1935 American, 1935 French, 1951, 1956, 1970, 1983, 1998 TV & 2002)
 Crime and Punishment in Suburbia (2000)
 Crime Spree (2003)
 Crime Wave: (1954 & 1985)
 Crime Without Passion (1934)
 Crimes of the Black Cat (1972)
 Crimes of the Future: (1970 & 2022)
 Crimes of the Heart (1986)
 Crimes and Misdemeanors (1989)
 Crimes of Passion: (1984 & 2013)
 Crimewave (1985)
 Criminal: (2004 & 2016)
 Criminal Law (1989)
 The Criminal Life of Archibaldo de la Cruz (1955)
 Criminal Lovers (1999)
 Crimson Peak (2015)
 The Crimson Permanent Assurance (1983)
 The Crimson Pirate (1952)
 The Crimson Rivers (2000)
 Crimson Rivers II: Angels of the Apocalypse (2004)
 Crimson Tide (1995)
 Crip Camp (2020)
 Crippled Avengers (1978)
 Crisis: (1939, 1946, 1950, 1972 TV & 2021)
 Crisis: Behind a Presidential Commitment (1963)
 Criss Cross (1949)
 CrissCross (1992)
 Christ Stopped at Eboli (1979)
 Critic's Choice (1963)
 Critters series:
 Critters (1986)
 Critters 2: The Main Course (1988)
 Critters 3 (1991)
 Critters 4 (1992)
 Critters Attack! (2019)
 Crocodile: (1980, 1996 & 2000)
 The Crocodile (2005)
 Crocodile 2: Death Swamp (2002)
 Crocodile Dundee series:
 Crocodile Dundee (1986)
 Crocodile Dundee II (1988)
 Crocodile Dundee in Los Angeles (2001)
 The Crocodile Hunter: Collision Course (2002)
 Cromwell (1970)
 Cronos (1993)
 The Croods (2013)
 The Croods: A New Age (2020)
 Crooked Arrows (2012)
 Crooked House (2017)
 Crooklyn (1994)
 Crooks Anonymous (1962)
 The Crop (2004)
 Cropsey (2009)
 Cross Creek (1983)
 Cross of Iron (1977)
 A Cross the Universe (2008)
 Crossed Lines (2007)
 Crossed Swords: (1954 & 1977)
 Crossfire (1947)
 Crossing the Bridge: The Sound of Istanbul (2005)
 Crossing Delancey (1988)
 The Crossing: (1990, 2000 TV, 2010, 2014 & 2020)
 The Crossing Guard (1995)
 Crossing Over (2009)
 Crossover: (1980 & 2006)
 Crossroads: (1937, 1938, 1942, 1976, 1986, 1998 & 2002)
 Crouching Tiger, Hidden Dragon (2000)
 Crouching Tiger, Hidden Dragon: Sword of Destiny (2016)
 Croupier (1998)
 The Crow series:
 The Crow (1994)
 The Crow: City of Angels (1996)
 The Crow: Salvation (2000)
 The Crow: Wicked Prayer (2005)
 The Crowd (1928)
 The Crowd Roars: (1932 & 1938)
 Crowhaven Farm (1970) (TV)
 Crown Heights (2017)
 Crown Vic (2019)
 Crowned and Dangerous (1997)
 Crows Explode (2014)
 Crows and Sparrows (1949)
 The Crucible: (1914, 1957, 1996 & 2011)
 The Crucified Lovers (1954)
 The Crucifixion (2017)
 Crude: (2007 & 2009)
 Crude Oil (2008)
 Cruel Intentions series:
 Cruel Intentions (1999)
 Cruel Intentions 2 (2001)
 Cruel Intentions 3 (2004)
 The Cruel Sea: (1953 & 1972)
 Cruel Story of Youth (1960)
 Cruel and Unusual: (2006 & 2014)
 Cruel, Cruel Love (1914)
 Cruella (2021)
 Cruising (1980)
 Crumb (1994)
 The Crusades (1935)
 The Crush (1993)
 Crush (2001)
 Crush and Blush (2008)
 Crustacés et coquillages (2005)
 Cry of the Banshee (1970)
 Cry of the City (1948)
 Cry Danger (1951)
 A Cry in the Dark (1988)
 Cry Freedom (1987)
 Cry Macho (2021)
 Cry Me a River (2008)
 Cry of a Prostitute (1974)
 Cry of the Werewolf (1944)
 A Cry in the Wild (1990)
 Cry Wolf: (1947 & 2005)
 Cry Woman (2002)
 Cry, the Beloved Country: (1951 & 1995)
 Cry-Baby (1990)
Crying Freeman (1996)
 The Crying Game (1992)
 Crying Out In Love (2016)
 Crying Out Love in the Center of the World (2004)
 Cryptids (TBD)
 Cryptozoo (2021)
 Cría cuervos (1976)

Ct-Cz

 Cthulhu: (2000 & 2007)
 Cthulhu Mansion (1990)
 Cuadecuc, vampir (1971)
 Cuba (1979)
 The Cuban (2019)
 Cuban Rebel Girls (1959)
 Cube series:
 Cube (1997)
 Cube 2: Hypercube (2002)
 Cube Zero (2004)
 Cuckoo: (2009 & 2014)
 The Cuckoo (2002)
 Cujo (1983)
 Cul-de-sac: (1966 & 2010)
 The Culpepper Cattle Co. (1972)
 The Cup: (1999 & 2011)
 Cupid Angling (1918)
 Curdled (1996)
 Cure (1997)
 The Cure: (1917, 1995 & 2014)
 A Cure for Wellness (2017)
 Cured (2020)
 Curfew: (1925, 1989, 1994 & 2012)
 The Curiosity of Chance (2006)
 Curiosity Kills the Cat (2006)
 The Curious Case of Benjamin Button (2008)
 The Curious Dr. Humpp (1969)
 Curious George (2006)
 Curly Sue (1991)
 Current: (1992 & 2009)
 The Current War (2017)
 The Curse: (1924 & 1987)
 Curse II: The Bite (1989)
 Curse III: Blood Sacrifice (1990)
 The Curse of the Aztec Mummy (1957)
 The Curse of Belphegor (1967)
 Curse of the Black Widow (1977) (TV)
 The Curse of the Cat People (1944)
 Curse of the Crimson Altar (1968)
 Curse of the Demon (1958)
 Curse of the Fly (1965)
 The Curse of Frankenstein (1957)
 Curse of the Golden Flower (2007)
 The Curse of the Jade Scorpion (2001)
 The Curse of La Llorona (2019)
 Curse of the Pink Panther (1983)
 The Curse of Sleeping Beauty (2016)
 Curse of the Undead (1959)
 The Curse of the Werewolf (1961)
 Cursed: (2004 & 2005)
 The Cursed (2021)
 The Cursed Ones (2015)
 Curtain (1920)
 Curtains: (1983 & 1995)
 Curucu, Beast of the Amazon (1956)
 The Curve: (1998 & 2020)
 Custer's Last Fight (1912)
 Cut: (2000 & 2011)
 The Cut: (2007, 2014 Canadian, 2014 International & 2017)
 Cut Throat City (2020)
 Cute Girl (1980)
 Cutie Honey (2004)
 Cutie Honey: Tears (2016)
 Cuties (2020)
 Cutter's Way (1981)
 Cutthroat Island (1995)
 Cutting Class (1989)
 The Cutting Edge (1992)
 The Cutting Edge: Fire and Ice (2010) (TV)
 The Cutting Edge: Going for the Gold (2006) (TV)
 Cutting It Short (1980)
 Cyberman (2001)
 Cyborg series:
 Cyborg (1989)
 Cyborg 2 (1993)
 Cyborg 3: The Recycler (1994)
 Cyborg 2087 (1966)
 Cyclomania (2001)
 Cyclops: (1976, 1982, 1987 & 2008 TV)
 The Cyclops (1957)
 Cypher (2002)
 Cyrano (2021)
 Cyrano de Bergerac: (1900, 1925, 1946, 1950, 1972 TV, 1990 & 2008 TV)
 Czech Dream (2004)
 CzechMate: In Search of Jiří Menzel (2018)
 Czechoslovakia 1968 (1969)

Previous:  List of films: B    Next:  List of films: D

See also 
 Lists of films
 Lists of actors
 List of film and television directors
 List of documentary films
 List of film production companies

-